The Archaeological Museum of Aigion is a museum in Aigion, Greece opened on August 6, 1994. The building of the museum which originally housed the municipal market of Aigio. It was designed by the architect Ernst Ziller and was built in 1890.

In the museum there are six rooms  covering findings from the Neolithic period to the late Roman.

References

Kolonas L., Museum of Aigio, Ταμείο Αρχαιολογικών Πόρων και Απαλλοτριώσεων, Athens 2004

External links
 Hellenic Ministry of Culture, Archaeological Museum of Aigion (includes photos)
 Municipality of Aigialeia official website (Greek only)

Aigion
Museums established in 1994
1994 establishments in Greece